Minuscule 177 (in the Gregory-Aland numbering), α 106 (Soden), is a Greek minuscule manuscript of the New Testament, on parchment. Palaeographically it has been assigned  to the 11th century. Formerly it was labelled by 179a, 128p, and 82r. It has marginalia.

Description 
The codex contains the text of the Acts of the Apostles, Pauline epistles, and Book of Revelation on 225 parchment leaves (size ). The text is written in one column per page, in 25 lines per page.

It has also a treatise of Pseudo-Dorotheus on the Seventy disciples and twelve apostles (as codices 82, 93, 459, 613, 617, 699).

Text 
The Greek text of the codex is a representative of the Byzantine text-type. Aland placed it in Category V.

The text is very close to the Textus Receptus. It contains the Comma Johanneum (in 1 John 5:7) at the margin added in the 17th or 18th century.

History 

The manuscript once belonged to Zomozerab, the Bohemian. The portion of the manuscript which contains the text of the Apocalypse was collated by Franz Delitzsch. C. R. Gregory saw the manuscript in 1887.

It was added to the list of New Testament manuscripts by Scholz. Formerly it was labelled by 179a, 128p, and 82r. In 1908 Gregory gave the number 177 to it.

It is currently housed at the Bavarian State Library (Gr. 211), at Munich.

See also 
 List of New Testament minuscules
 Biblical manuscript
 Textual criticism

References

Further reading 
 F. Delitzsch, Handschriftliche Funde 2 (Leipzig, 1862), pp. 45–48.

External links 
 Minuscule 177 at the Encyclopedia of Textual Criticism

Greek New Testament minuscules
11th-century biblical manuscripts